Snizort is an area of the Isle of Skye comprising the head of Loch Snizort and the western coast of Trotternish up to Uig, which is the largest settlement.

References

Sources

Civil parishes of Scotland
Isle of Skye